Pelumpong Spit is the easternmost point in the Brunei-Muara district of Brunei. Despite its name being labeled as a spit, it is now an island due to the artificially constructed 50m-wide, 10m-deep Muara cut, which separated the spit from the mainland to provide access to Muara Port.

Location and Geography

Tanjong Pelumpong is located between the Brunei Bay to the south and the South China Sea to the north. Administratively, it is part of Mukim Serasa of the Brunei-Muara district of Brunei and is separated from the mainland to the west by the 50m-wide, 10m-deep Muara cut. This channel is protected at each side by breakwaters which extend seawards towards the northeast.

The northern coast of Tanjong Pelumpong consists of the white sandy beach similar to that of Muara Beach. This is because it was a continuation of the latter until the Muara Cut divided it into two. There is however, a series of beach protection structures constructed here to prevent soil erosion. The island is forested with pine trees. The island is inhabited and is only accessible by boat.

History
The history of Tanjong Pelumpong is closely related to the history of Brooketon and Muara. The whole area, including Tanjong Pelumpong, was leased to Charles Brooke, the White Rajah of Sarawak by 1889. Politically too, even though he only had economic rights, Brooke became the de facto ruler of the area. It was not until 1921 that Muara was "returned" to Brunei. The Japanese occupied Brunei during Second World War, and Tanjong Pelumpong was in 1945 one of the landing location of the Australian forces during the World War II which liberated Brunei from the Imperial Japanese.

The Muara Cut was initiated in the 1960s to provide access to Muara Port. This was done by excavating and then dredging a 10m channel at the narrowest point of Tanjong Pelumpong which converted Tanjong Pelumpong from a spit to an island. A minke whale was beached on the island in 2003. 

There are plans to further deepen the Muara cut to a depth of 16m in order to facilitate the expansion of Muara Port to Pulau Muara Besar.  The dredged sand will be used for land reclamation on Pulau Muara Besar for the proposed port construction and extension.

Activities
Tanjong Pelumpong and the Muara cut are used by the general public for recreational activities.  The Muara cut is a popular spot for anglers and fishermen.  The island itself has numerous pristine beaches and is a popular spot for picnicking. There are a number of fish farms in the sheltered area of the Brunei Bay between Tanjong Pelumpong (island) and Muara Besar Island. Due to its remoteness, the island is also used for other illicit activities such as smuggling.

Notes

Islands of Brunei